Events during the year 1942 in  Northern Ireland.

Incumbents
 Governor - 	 The Duke of Abercorn 
 Prime Minister - J. M. Andrews

Events
1 January – Clogher Valley Railway ceases operations and closes.
26 January – First United States troops for the European Theatre of World War II arrive in the United Kingdom at Belfast.

Sport

Football
Irish League
Winners: Belfast Celtic

Irish Cup
Winners: Linfield 3 - 1 Glentoran

Births
13 January – Arthur Stewart, footballer (died 2018).
19 February – Phil Coulter, musician and music producer.
12 March – Christina Reid, playwright (died 2015).
1 May – Eric Welsh, footballer.
8 May – Terry Neill, footballer and football manager.
2 June – Ken Robinson, Ulster Unionist Party MLA.
10 June – Gordon Burns, journalist and television presenter.
16 August – Frank McManus, solicitor and former Unity MP.
3 September – Paddy Kennedy, Republican Labour Party Councillor and MP (died 1999).
9 September – Kieran McCarthy, Alliance Party MLA.
14 September – Bernard MacLaverty, fiction writer.
16 November – Geoffrey Squires, poet.
3 December – Mike Gibson, rugby union international.

Deaths
19 May – Sir Joseph Larmor, physicist (born 1857).

See also
1942 in Scotland
1942 in Wales

References